Michael Sheasby is an Australian actor, known for his roles as Steve Carmody in the Seven Network television soap opera Home and Away (2012), as Bert Ford in the Seven Network drama series A Place to Call Home (2013–2014), as Hayden Cole in the Network Ten psychological thriller drama The Secrets She Keeps (2020) and as Walter Moody in the TVNZ drama television miniseries The Luminaries (2020) wherein viewers were entranced by the authenticity of his Scottish accent.

Early life
Sheasby was born in  Pietermaritzburg, South Africa and immigrated with his family to Australia in 2001.

Filmography

Stage

Awards and nominations

References

External links

21st-century Australian male actors
National Institute of Dramatic Art alumni
Australian male film actors
Australian male television actors
Living people
Year of birth missing (living people)